Jacaranda copaia is a flowering pioneer tree belonging to the genus Jacaranda. It is native to the Amazon Rainforest in Northern of South America.

Description
The tree is evergreen or semi-deciduous and produces bluish purple flowers from August to November. Young trees have a long trunk with no branches. Large leaves grow directly from the top of the trunk giving them an appearance similar to tree ferns, particularly immature Schizolobium parahyba. The top consists of a "vase-shaped crown" of branches and leaves.

Distribution
Jacaranda copaia is native Northern South America. It is common in the Brazilian Amazon where, as a pioneer species, it colonizes gaps in the forest and areas that have been cleared.

Uses
During the dry season, the leafy branches are burned as a way to repel biting insects. The bark has been used as a laxative and to treat dysentery and syphilis. The leaves have been used to treat leishmaniasis, fevers, yaws and ringworm. The Guyana Patamona use the juice of young leaves to treat persistent sores. The native people in Kurupukari, Guyana also use parts of the tree for treating ulcers and sores.

References

copaia
Trees of northern South America
Trees of western South America
Trees of the Amazon
Trees of Peru